Gnomon. Kritische Zeitschrift für die gesamte klassische Altertumswissenschaft (Gnomon: Critical Journal of the Entire Field of Scholarship on Classical Antiquity) is a German review journal covering the classics. It was established in 1925, first published by Verlag Weidmann and since 1949 by Verlag C. H. Beck. The journal appears in 8 issues each year and contains reviews, obituaries, and notices. Since 1950, odd-numbered volumes contain a "Bibliographic Supplement" of new books, dissertations and submitted journal articles, in addition to the regular contents. The editors-in-chief are Hans-Joachim Gehrke, Martin Hose, Henner von Hesberg, Ernst Vogt, and Paul Zanker.

Abstracting and indexing 
The journal is abstracted and indexed in the Arts & Humanities Citation Index and Current Contents/Arts & Humanities. In both 2007 and 2011 the journal received an "INT1"  ranking (internationally recognised with high visibility) from the European Reference Index for the Humanities.

Gnomon Bibliographische Datenbank 
In 1994 the Gnomon Bibliographische Datenbank (Gnomon bibliographic database) was established, containing data on Gnomon articles, monographs, book chapters, journal articles from over 200 classics journals. Entries were in German or English. Since the beginning of 1996 there has been a sister project, Gnomon Online, which provides access to the database through the internet and is updated weekly.

List of editors 
The following persons have been editor-in-chief of the journal:

References

External links
 
 Online access at JSTOR
 Gnomon Bibliographische Datenbank
 

Classics journals
Archaeology journals
Publications established in 1925